Goslar may refer to:

 Goslar, a city in Lower Saxony, Germany.
 Goslar (district), a district in Lower Saxony, Germany.
 Goslar (ship), a German steamboat scuttled in the Suriname River

People
 Jürgen Goslar (1927-2021), a German actor.
 Hanneli Goslar (1928-2022), a nurse and a former friend of Anne Frank